The Lycoming O-290 is a dual ignition, four-cylinder, air-cooled, horizontally opposed aircraft engine. It was first run in 1939, and entered production three years later.

A common variant of the type is the O-290-G, a single ignition model which was designed to drive a generator as part of a ground power unit.

Variants

Civil models
O-290
Base model engine certified 27 July 1942.  at 2450 rpm, 6.25:1 compression ratio, dry weight 
O-290-A
Certified 27 July 1942.  at 2600 rpm continuous,  at 2800 rpm for 5 minutes, 6.5:1 compression ratio, dry weight  with SR4L-8 or N-8 magnetos,  with N-20 or N-21 magnetos.
O-290-AP
Certified 21 July 1944.  at 2600 rpm continuous,  at 2800 rpm for 5 minutes, 6.5:1 compression ratio, dry weight  with SR4L-8 or N-8 magnetos,  with N-20 or N-21 magnetos.
O-290-B
Certified 22 January 1943.  at 2600 rpm continuous,  at 2800 rpm for 5 minutes, 6.5:1 compression ratio, dry weight .
O-290-C
Certified 22 January 1943.  at 2600 rpm continuous,  at 2800 rpm for 5 minutes, 6.5:1 compression ratio, dry weight .
O-290-CP
Certified 21 July 1944.  at 2600 rpm continuous,  at 2800 rpm for 5 minutes, 6.5:1 compression ratio, dry weight .
O-290-D
Certified 13 December 1949.  at 2600 rpm continuous,  at 2800 rpm for 5 minutes, 6.5:1 compression ratio, dry weight .
O-290-D2
Certified 1 May 1952.  at 2600 rpm continuous,  at 2800 rpm for 5 minutes, 7.5:1 compression ratio, dry weight .
O-290-D2A
Certified 20 April 1953.  at 2600 rpm continuous,  at 2800 rpm for 5 minutes, 7.5:1 compression ratio, dry weight .
O-290-D2B
Certified 30 September 1954.  at 2600 rpm continuous,  at 2800 rpm for 5 minutes, 7.0:1 compression ratio, dry weight .
O-290-D2C
Certified 8 May 1961.  at 2600 rpm continuous,  at 2800 rpm for 5 minutes, 7.0:1 compression ratio, dry weight .
O-290-G
Non-certified, single ignition model intended for use driving a generator in a ground power unit, . Has been widely used in homebuilt aircraft, including the prototype Van's Aircraft RV-3.

Military models
O-290-1
Identical to the O-290-B
O-290-3
Identical to the O-290-C
O-290-11
Identical to the O-290-D

Applications

Specifications (O-290-D2A)

See also

References

 

O-290
Boxer engines
1930s aircraft piston engines